The Town of LaSalle (incorporated in 1910 as the ) is a Statutory Town in Weld County, Colorado, United States.  The town population was 1,955 at the 2010 United States Census.

A post office called La Salle has been in operation since 1886. The community was named by railroad officials after LaSalle Street in Chicago.

Geography
LaSalle is located at  (40.350681, -104.702914).

Demographics

As of the census of 2000, there were 1,849 people, 651 households, and 486 families residing in the town. The racial makeup of the town was 78.85% White, 0.38% African American, 0.76% Native American, 0.16% Asian, 0.22% Pacific Islander, 16.12% from other races, and 3.52% from two or more races. Hispanic or Latino of any race were 31.64% of the population.

There were 651 households, out of which 39.2% had children under the age of 18 living with them, 60.5% were married couples living together, 11.1% had a female householder with no husband present, and 25.2% were non-families. 18.7% of all households were made up of individuals, and 9.4% had someone living alone who was 65 years of age or older.  The average household size was 2.84 and the average family size was 3.30.

In the town, the population was spread out, with 30.1% under the age of 18, 8.3% from 18 to 24, 27.7% from 25 to 44, 23.5% from 45 to 64, and 10.4% who were 65 years of age or older.  The median age was 33 years. For every 100 females, there were 101.6 males.  For every 100 females age 18 and over, there were 98.0 males.

The median income for a household in the town was $41,534, and the median income for a family was $46,442. Males had a median income of $30,673 versus $22,292 for females. The per capita income for the town was $18,262.  About 10.4% of families and 12.0% of the population were below the poverty line, including 18.2% of those under age 18 and 8.9% of those age 65 or over.

See also

Outline of Colorado
Index of Colorado-related articles
State of Colorado
Colorado cities and towns
Colorado municipalities
Colorado counties
Weld County, Colorado
Colorado metropolitan areas
Front Range Urban Corridor
North Central Colorado Urban Area
Denver-Aurora-Boulder, CO Combined Statistical Area
Greeley, CO Metropolitan Statistical Area

References

External links
Town of LaSalle website
CDOT map of the Town of LaSalle

Towns in Colorado
Towns in Weld County, Colorado